Sir William Taylour Thomson  (1813-1883) was a British military officer and diplomat.

Military career 

He was a gifted military officer. When the British ship "Tigris" sank in the Euphrates river he was one of the survivors. In 1839 he participated in taking of Herat. He served in Iran in 1849 and 1853 to 1855.

Diplomatic career 

He was the British Chargé d'Affaires to Persia between 1849–55 and Envoy Extraordinary and Minister Plenipotentiary 1872-79 Between 1855 and 1873 he served in Chile. He was succeeded by his younger brother Ronald Ferguson Thomson.

He retired to Edinburgh living at 27 Royal Terrace, an impressive Georgian townhouse on Calton Hill.

He died on 15 September 1883 and is buried in Warriston Cemetery in an unusual double sarcophagus next to his wife. The grave lies on the north side of a main diagonal path just south of the vaults.

References

External links 
 The Edinburgh Gazette, February 25, 1873

British expatriates in Iran
British expatriates in Chile
Companions of the Order of the Bath
Knights Commander of the Order of St Michael and St George
19th-century British military personnel
1813 births
1883 deaths
British people of the Anglo-Persian War
Burials at Warriston Cemetery